The 1976 Ipswich Borough Council election was the second election to the Ipswich Borough Council which had been established by the Local Government Act 1972 in England and Wales. It took place as part of the 1976 United Kingdom local elections.  

There were 14 wards returning between 2 and 5 councillors each. The Conservative Party gained control of the Council. It took place as part of the 1976 United Kingdom local elections.

References

Ipswich Borough Council elections
Ipswich